Herstappe is a Flemish municipality located in the Belgian province of Limburg. On January 1, 2016, Herstappe had a total population of 89. The total area is 1.35 km² which gives a population density of 66 inhabitants per km². It is the least populous municipality in Belgium, and the third smallest in area.

Herstappe has a bilingual (Limburgish and Walloon) population. Formally it is a municipality with linguistic facilities for French speakers, which has so far prevented a merger with neighbouring Tongeren from taking place.

Public buildings
The village holds a cafe, a municipal office, a catholic church and a post office. All have bilingual signposts.

Elections
For the Belgian local elections, 2012, Herstappe was the only Belgian municipality where elections were not held as there was only one candidate list. Previously, this had already happened between 1958 and 1994.

Mayors
The former mayor (mayor from 1994 to 2014), Serge Louwet, was the lowest paid Belgian mayor in 2012 with 675 € for his monthly wages. Actually, his official salary is 1,400 € but he considered it too high and kept only 675, the rest being given back to the municipal treasurer.

In 2014, mayor Louwet resigned in favour of Claudy Prosmans. The first action of the new mayor was to guide Herstappe into the digital era. He wanted to buy a computer for the town hall, complete with an internet connection, and they were also looking into the creation of an official website.

Gallery

References

External links
 

Municipalities of Limburg (Belgium)